Patrick and Benjamin Binder (born February 2, 1987) were conjoined twins, joined at the head, born in Germany in early 1987, and separated at Johns Hopkins Children’s Center on September 7, 1987.  They were the first twins to be successfully separated by neurosurgeon Ben Carson, of Baltimore, Maryland.  For this operation Carson was able to prepare by studying a three-dimensional physical model of the twins' anatomy.  Carson described this separation as the first of its kind, with 23 similar attempted separations ending in the death of one or both twins.

Although Carson was able to separate the boys, they were both left profoundly disabled.  The Associated Press reported, in 1989, two years after the separation, that Patrick remained in a "vegetative state", following the surgery. He never came out of his coma.  According to a 2015 Washington Post article, he "died sometime in the last decade".

Benjamin recovered to a certain extent.  The Washington Post reported that Peter Parlagi, the twins' uncle, said their father was emotionally unable to ever handle them, or share in their care.  He said the twin's father became an alcoholic, spent all the couple's funds, and left their mother destitute and alone.  She was forced to institutionalize them.

In a 1993 interview, their mother, Theresia Binder, described guilt for agreeing to the operation that ruined the boys' prospect of ever having any quality of life.  According to the Washington Post's 2015 interview with Parlagi, Benjamin never learned to speak or feed himself, but he does enjoy visitors, and being taken for walks.

References 

1987 births
Living people
Binder, Benjamin
German twins